KNDY 1570 AM/94.1 FM is a commercial broadcast station in Marysville, Kansas that plays classic country music as well as local news, weather, and sports coverage. The station signed on the air July 10, 1956 and celebrated 50 year s of broadcasting in July 2006 by moving into a new broadcast studio with sister-station KNDY-FM 95.5.

On May 2, 2011, the station signed on Translator K231AX on 94.1 MHz operating at 250 watts. The translator station repeats all programming from 1570 kHz and covers Marshall County, Kansas.

Newscasts
Monday–Friday
KNDY Morning News (7:00–8:00am)
KNDY Midday News (12:00–1:00pm)
KNDY Evening News (5:00–6:00pm)

Saturday
KNDY News Saturday Morning (7:00–8:00am)

Sunday
KNDY News Sunday Morning (8:00–8:15am)
KNDY Public Affairs (8:15–8:30am)
KNDY News Midday Sunday (midnight – 12:15am)
KNDY Public Affairs (Repeat) (12:15–12:30pm)

Sports programming
KNDY 1570 AM is an affiliate of the Learfield Sports Kansas State Wildcats radio network. The station features play by play of K-State football and men's basketball. For many years, 1570 AM was home to local high school football and basketball until KNDY-FM 95.5 signed on in 1974. With the addition of translator K231AX in 2011 Marysville High School football and boys and girls basketball will return to KNDY AM 1570/FM 94.1.

External links

NDY (AM)
Classic country radio stations in the United States